Graham Howe (born 1950) is a curator, writer, photo-historian, artist, and founder and CEO of Curatorial, Inc., a museum services organization supporting nonprofit traveling exhibitions. Curatorial Inc. manages the E.O. Hoppé Estate Collection and the Paul Outerbridge II Collection among others. Born in Sydney, Australia, Howe now resides in Los Angeles and London.

Education
Graham Howe received his bachelor's degree (Diploma of Art & Design in Photography, Film and Art History, (Hons)) in 1971 from Prahran College of Advanced Education, Melbourne, Australia where he was a student and employee of Gordon De Lisle whom he regarded "as the Sam Haskins of Australia".  He continued his tertiary studies in 1976, gaining his Master of Arts degree at the University of California, Los Angeles, California (UCLA) in Painting Sculpture, and Graphic Arts (Majoring in Photography) in 1978 where he studied with Robert Heinecken, achieving his Master of Fine Arts degree in 1979.

Career 
In 1972, Howe became one of the first employees of The Photographers' Gallery, London, a research assistant at the Royal Photographic Society, London, and, in 1973, the founding Director of the Australian Centre for Photography, Sydney, where in 1974 he organised a exhibition and publication of contemporary practitioners New photography Australia : a selective survey, and published Aspects of Australian Photography.

In 1976, he became the curator for Graham Nash and from 1977 was Los Angeles Correspondent for the Australian journal Light Vision, to which he contributed a photo-essay Sneaker in the Sky for the January 1978 edition. From 1984 to 1985 he was a visiting curator at the Museum of Contemporary Art, Los Angeles.

In 1988, he incorporated Curatorial Assistance, Inc., a company specializing in art and museum services, and in 2000 he founded Curatorial Assistance Traveling Exhibitions, a 501(c)3 nonprofit organization that originates and travels exhibitions of art to museums worldwide.

Collections 
Howe's photographic work is collected in museums and galleries including Harvard University, the Metropolitan Museum of Art, New York, the Los Angeles County Museum of Art, the San Francisco Museum of Modern Art, the Victoria & Albert Museum, London, and he is an advisor for the Lucie Awards and a recipient of a National Endowment for the Arts Photography Fellowship and a Ford Foundation grant.

Artist exhibitions
Art of Illusion: Photography and Perceptual Play, Nelson-Atkins Museum of Art, Kansas City, Missouri, 2021
California Cool: Art in Los Angeles 1960s–70s, National Gallery of Australia, Canberra, 2018-19
Forsaken Utopias: Photographs from the OCMA Permanent Collection, Orange County Museum of Art, Santa Ana, California, 2018
Graham Howe: Colour Theory, Rooftop Gallery, Bangkok, 2013
Graham Howe: Color Theory, Sol Mednick Gallery, University of the Arts, Philadelphia, 2012
Street Sight, Armory Center for the Arts, Pasadena. Curated by Tim Wride, 2011.
Time Signatures, Grunwald Study Center for the Graphic Arts, Hammer Museum, 2011
And Howe! Photographs By Graham Howe, 1968–2008, (mid-career survey)California Museum of Photography, Riverside. Curated by Colin Westerbeck, 2009.
Graham Howe, Gallery Min, Tokyo, Japan, 1984, publication with essay by Colin Westerbeck
Arranged Image Photography, a traveling exhibition organized by the Boise Gallery of Art, 1983–1984
Graham Howe, BC Space, Laguna Beach, California, 1981
Graham Howe, The Photographers’ Gallery, Melbourne, Australia, 1980
Invented Images, a traveling exhibition organized by the University Art Museum, Santa Barbara, 1980
Attitudes: Photography in the 1970s, The Santa Barbara Museum of Art, 1979
The Photograph as Artifice, a traveling exhibition organized by The Art Galleries, California State University, 1978

Curatorial research and publications 
Howe's main area of expertise is early Modern twentieth century photography. He has published extensively on the work of American photographer, Paul Outerbridge (1896-1958) and British photographer, E.O. Hoppé (1878-1972).

References

External links

Personal website 
2008 Interview, with MacRadio, Harris Fogel
1974 Interview, as Director of the Australian Centre for Photography

1950 births
Living people
American art curators
Australian art curators
American art historians
Australian art historians
Australian photographers
Photography curators
Historians of photography